The First National Bank of North Arkansas (from 1913 to 2011 the First National Bank of Berryville) was founded in 1889 and is one of the oldest functioning regional banks in Arkansas.

In 2022, the bank announced it would seek a state bank charter, and would seek a name change to Bank of 1889.

References

External links 
Homepage

Banks based in Arkansas
Banks established in 1889
1889 establishments in Arkansas